Toscana Aeroporti S.p.A. (Tuscan Airports) is an Italian company that manages Florence and Pisa International Airport. It is listed in Borsa Italiana.

The company was found on 1 June 2015 by the incorporation of Aeroporto di Firenze S.p.A. (AdF) into Società Aeroporto Toscano Galileo Galilei S.p.A. (SAT), as well as the latter renamed into Toscana Aeroporti S.p.A., relocated the headquarter from Pisa to Florence.

Shareholders
As of 3 February 2016

References

External links
 

Airport operators of Italy
Companies based in Florence
Companies based in Pisa
Italian companies established in 2015
Region-owned companies of Italy
Transport companies established in 2015
Transport in Tuscany